George William Brown OBE FBA (born 1930) is a medical sociologist who works in the field of social nature of mental illness.

Life and work
Brown was born in Portobello, London, in 1930, as one of non-identical twins. His father was a lens maker and his mother had been a waitress. In 1948, he was called up for national service in the Air Force. He then went to University College London in 1951, studying archaeology and anthropology. After a series of jobs he obtained a research post at the Social Psychiatry Research Unit at the Maudsley Hospital. It was here that he began his research into schizophrenia.

In the second half of the 1950s, Brown introduced the Expressed-Emotion-Concept, which since then has been broadly being adopted among researchers and practitioners in the fields of social psychiatry, psychiatry and therapy in general.

In 1968 he moved to the Social Research Unit at Bedford College, London, where he became first Deputy Director, then joint Director. It was here that he developed his research into the social aspects of depression. He also developed with Margot Jefferys a MSc in medical sociology.

Publications
 Wing, J.K., & Brown, G.W. (1970). Institutionalism and Schizophrenia: A Comparative Study of Three Mental Hospitals 1960-1968. Cambridge; Cambridge University Press.
 Brown, G.W., & Harris, T. (1978). Social origins of depression: A study of psychiatric disorder in women. London:Tavistock.

Awards
1986 Fellow of the British Academy
1995 OBE in the 1995 Birthday Honours
2002 DUniv, University of Essex

References

1930 births
British sociologists
Medical sociologists
Academics of Bedford College, London
Officers of the Order of the British Empire
Living people
Fellows of the British Academy